Beauté-sur-Marne was a royal castle near Vincennes, situated on the territory of the current commune of Nogent-sur-Marne.

"Of all the pleasant and agreeable places one can find in this world, built in a suitable way, gay and pretty, to live and reside, that which is at the end of the forest of Vincennes, which was built by King Charles -- god grant him peace, joy, and health -- his eldest son, the Daupin of Viennois, gives the name of Beauty." --  Ballad of Eustache Deschamps (1346-1406)

Charles V, who sought the calm at a distance of the official court of Vincennes restored "Beauty" in 1473. Beyond the drawbridge and the castle wall is a garden with a fountain. The manor is a large tower in which each floor is "of a piece". On the first floor, one finds the bedroom of Evangelists where the King sleeps. Elsewhere there is a library. On the second floor is another bedroom with an altar for saying Mass. The whole is refined, thus witness some 62 tiles composing a literary totality that have been found during the construction of the railroad and which are now deposited at the Carnavalet Museum in Paris.

It is remarkable that nothing is provided here to welcome the Queen, for whom Charles V bought the manor of Pleasure (Plaisance) in 1375. This manor, which gives its name to the commune of Neuilly-Plaisance, was held by his brother the Duke of Burgundy. The Duke of Anjou, another brother of the king, constructed another manor near Beauty, of which no trace remains.

In 1378, Charles IV of Luxemburg, Holy Roman Emperor, came to Beauty for a diplomatic visit to his nephew Charles V to discuss the hostilities of the English, and the co-existence of two popes. He was concerned mainly with strengthening the alliance between the two monarchies, already ancient, the house of Luxemburg being of French descent.

A manuscript at the National Library of France shows Charles V, King of France, welcoming the Emperor Charles IV and his son Wenceslas IV, king of Bohemia.

The emperor resided at the manor of Beauty from 12 to 16 January while Charles V remained at Vincennes, visiting Beauty each day: 

"At Beauty the Emperor remained several days and the King would visit each day and in secret parley at length" writes Christine of Pisan. 

The two men exchanged rings and luxurious presents, and on 16 January, Charles V reaccompanied his uncle to the manor of Pleasure.

Charles V died at Beauty 16 September 1380, and the manor fell into ruin.

It is not spoken of again until Charles VII made it a present to his mistress Agnès Sorel, Lady of Beauty.

"And the beauty which held the title of "the most beautiful of the world" should be called "Demoiselle of Beauty": Thus the king had given her for her lifetime the house of Beaulté lez Paris." (Enguerrand of Monstrelet 1390-1453)

Agnès Sorel (1422-1450), daughter of a Picardy gentleman, Jean Soreau, entered the life of Charles VII in 1443. She was of the household of Isabelle of Lorraine, wife of King René. When Charles saw her for the first time, he fell madly in love, and had no rest until he brought her to his court to make her his mistress.

In 1444, she became the first official favorite of a king of France. Showered with presents from Charles, she was also interested in affairs of state. She soon had a house train of the greatest celebrities of the kingdom, which provoked a real scandal at the court.

She had the most beautiful headboards, best tapestry, best linen and covers, best dishes, ring goods and jewels, best cooks and best everything. -- writes Chastelain (1405-1475).

A contemporary painting shows her dressed in a richly embroidered dress trimmed with fur, with a low-cut neckline, a decolletage demonstrating that she was extremely beautiful.

One can easily imagine, to the breadth of whole this luxury, the castle of Beauty-sur-Marne that the king gave her in 1448, making her thus the Lady of Beauty.

It is most beautiful and pretty and better situated of all in the Île de France.

It is in this atmosphere that Charles VII asserted his authority. He called together John Bureau, Jacques Coeur and Etienne Chevalier, all confidants of the beautiful Agnès, and all interfering in public affairs, and spoke these words, attributed to François I as a reminder:

"Sweet Agnès, more honor you deserve / the cause being to recover France / than what can be rendered inside a cloister of nuns or to a devoted hermit."

She died at the manor of Mesnil, in Normandy, while she had left to rejoin the king, in February 1450, three days after her delivery, most likely of complications of childbirth. However, it is also claimed that the dauphin, the future Louis XI, whose advances she repelled, poisoned her. She is buried at Loches, in Tourraine. Her tomb, initially situated in the church of Notre-Dame was desecrated during the revolution and her statue destroyed. Later, it has been transferred in the old home of the castle.

A painting of 1610 shows again the tower of the castle, that Richelieu will raze in 1626.

Châteaux in Val-de-Marne
Beauté